Gazi Hüsrev Pasha (died March 1632), also called Boşnak Hüsrev Pasha ("Hüsrev Pasha the Bosnian") or Ekrem Hüsrev Pasha ("Hüsrev Pasha the Kind"), was an Ottoman  Grand Vizier of Bosnian descent during the reign of Murad IV.

Early life
He hailed from the Sanjak of Bosnia. He studied in the Enderun palace school. In 1625, he was promoted to be a vizier (minister). During the second Abaza rebellion, Damad Halil Pasha, then grand vizier, attempted to capture the fort of Erzurum (in eastern Turkey), then under the control of Abaza Mehmed Pasha, the leader of the rebellion. However, after a siege of 70 days, Damad Halil Pasha failed to capture the city and was dismissed from the post. Hüsrev Pasha was appointed as the new grand vizier on April 6, 1628.

As grand vizier
Hüsrev Pasha laid siege on Erzurum once again on September 5, 1628. The operation was faster than Abaza Mehmed Pasha had anticipated, and the city was not ready for a long siege. On September 18, Abaza Mehmed surrendered. Hüsrev's easy victory, ending a long and costly rebellion, gained him fame and favor. He became the de facto ruler of the Empire, since, according to historian Joseph von Hammer, Hüsrev's instructions were more effective than the instructions of the 15-year-old sultan Murat IV. Hüsrev Pasha decreased the number of viziers in the porte and made a habit of executing his political opponents.

Baghdad campaign
Hüsrev's next mission was to reconquer Baghdad (capital of modern Iraq), which had recently been captured by the Safavid shah Abbas I. In late 1629, he began invading Persian territory around Baghdad. However, it happened so that the invasion was during the rainy season, and it was impossible to lay a siege on the city itself. Thus, Hüsrev Pasha chose to capture other cities around Baghdad, one of his subordinates defeating a Persian army. The siege of Baghdad began on June 22, 1630, and continued until November 14, 1630, without success. After this failure, Hüsrev Pasha decided to continue the operation the next year, in 1631. When the next year arrived, however, he delayed beginning the siege citing a lack of reinforcements. On October 25, 1631, he was dismissed from office.

Death
The news about Hüsrev's dismissal caused a general unrest in the empire. Hüsrev's successor, Hafız Ahmed Pasha, was killed by rebels in the palace. Murad IV blamed Hüsrev for the unrest and sent another pasha to Tokat (northern Turkey), the city where Hüsrev was residing, to execute him. After some minor clashes, Hüsrev was executed in March 1632.

See also
List of Ottoman Grand Viziers

References

17th-century Grand Viziers of the Ottoman Empire
Bosnian Muslims from the Ottoman Empire
Pashas
Executed people from the Ottoman Empire
Devshirme
17th-century executions by the Ottoman Empire
Executed Bosnia and Herzegovina people
Ottoman people of the Ottoman–Persian Wars
Year of birth unknown
1632 deaths